The people below have served as the Secretary of State of the U.S. state of Missouri.

List

References
Official Manual State of Missouri, 2005–2006.

External links
Official homepage of the Missouri Secretary of State
Publications by or about the Missouri Secretary of State’s Office at Internet Archive.

1820 establishments in Missouri Territory